An auto show (also: motor show or car show) is a public exhibition of current automobile models, debuts, concept cars, or out-of-production classics. The five most prestigious auto shows, sometimes called the "Big Five", are generally considered to be held in Frankfurt, Geneva, Detroit, Paris and Tokyo.

Africa and The Middle East

Dubai International Motor Show, UAE (November)
 Festival of motoring, South Africa, Johannesburg (October) (Biennial)
 Qatar Motor Show, Doha (January)
 idle Auto Fest, South Africa, Johannesburg (June) annually

Asia
 Dhaka Motor Show 
 Auto Expo (New Delhi, India)https://www.autoexpo.in/
 Azerbaijan International Automotive Exhibition
 Beijing International Automotive Exhibition (Auto China) (Biennial) 
 Busan Motor Show
 Bangkok International Motor Show (April)
 Guangzhou International Motor Show (Auto Guangzhou) 
 Indonesia International Auto Show (BSD City, August)
 Indonesia International Motor Show (Jakarta, April)
 Istanbul Auto Show
 Manila International Auto Show (Manila, April)
 Osaka Auto Messe (Osaka, February 
 Pakistan Auto Show (Karachi, Lahore)
 Philippine International Motor Show (Pasay, August)
 Seoul Mobility Show
 Shanghai Motor Show aka Auto Shanghai (Biennial) 
 Thrissur Motor Show (India)
 Tokyo Auto Salon (Tokyo, January) 
 Tokyo Motor Show (October–November)
 Thailand International Motor Expo (December)
 Vietnam Motor Show (October)

Europe

Athens International Motor Show, Athens
Auto Mobil International (AMI Leipzig), (Leipzig, Germany)
AutoRAI, Amsterdam
Autosport International (Birmingham, United Kingdom, January)
Azerbaijan International Automotive Exhibition
Barcelona International Motor Show, Barcelona (May - biennial) 
Bologna Motor Show
British International Motor Show
Brussels Motor Show
Chantilly Arts & Elegance Richard Mille (June - biennial)
Concorso d'Eleganza Villa d'Este
Essen Motor Show
European Motor Show, (Brussels Motor Show), (Brussels)
Geneva Motor Show (Salon International de l'Auto) (March) 
Goodwood Festival of Speed 
Helsinki Motor Show, Helsinki, Finland
International Motor Show Germany (IAA), Munich (September - biennial)
 Istanbul Auto Show
London Motorfair (1977-1991)
London Motor Show 
London Motorexpo, Canary Wharf
Madrid Motor Show, Madrid (May) (biennial) 
Michelin Challenge Bibendum
Mille Miglia
Mondial de l'Automobile, Paris, (September–October - biennial)
Power Big Meet
Rallyday
The Commercial Vehicle Show, (Birmingham)
Truckfest, United Kingdom

Latin America
 Salón Internacional del Automóvil México (Mexico City, Mexico) - (September–October)
 São Paulo International Motor Show, (Salão International do Automóvel de São Paulo), (São Paulo, Brazil) - (October–November)
 Autoclasica , (Buenos Aires, Argentina) - (October)

North America
 Alabama International Auto Show (Birmingham, Alabama)
 Amelia Island Concours d'Elegance (Amelia Island, Florida)
 Canadian International Auto Show (Toronto, Ontario)
 Cleveland Auto Show (Cleveland, Ohio)
 Chicago Auto Show
 Detroit Autorama (Detroit, Michigan)
 First Hawaiian International Auto Show (Honolulu)
 Fleetwood Country Cruize-In Auto Show (London, Ontario)
 Greater Milwaukee Auto Show
 Hot Import Nights (various venues)
 Houston Auto Show
 LA Auto Show
 Memphis International Auto Show (Memphis, Tennessee)
 Miami International Auto Show (Miami, Florida)
 Moab Jeep Safari, (Moab, Utah)
 Montreal International Auto Show (Montreal, Quebec)
 Nashville International Auto and Truck Show (Nashville, Tennessee)
 New England International Auto Show (Boston, Massachusetts
 New England Summer Nationals (Worcester, Massachusetts)
 Newport Concours d'Elegance
 New York International Auto Show
 North American International Auto Show (Detroit, Michigan)
 Orange County Auto Show, (California International Auto Show), (Anaheim, California)
 Pebble Beach Concours d'Elegance
 Pennsylvania Auto Show, (Harrisburg, Pennsylvania)
 Philadelphia Auto Show
 Portland International Auto Show
 Powerama Motoring Expo
 Salon de l'auto de Québec (Quebec City)
 Salon International de l’Auto de Montréal
 Scarsdale Concours d'Elegance (Scarsdale, New York)
 Sevenstock (Irvine, California, September)
 Texas Auto Show
 Ultimate Motorhead Show (Bloomsburg, Pennsylvania) 
 Vancouver International Auto Show, (Vancouver, British Columbia)
 Washington Auto Show
 Woodward Dream Cruise (Oakland County, Michigan, August)

Oceania
 Australian International Motor Show, (Sydney Motor Show), (Sydney), (Melbourne)
 Melbourne International Motor Show, (Melbourne)

Defunct Auto Shows 

 Teamwork & Technology: For Today and Tomorrow, (New York City, New York)
 Great West Truck Show (Las Vegas, Nevada)

See also
Organisation Internationale des Constructeurs d'Automobiles
Green vehicle motor show

References

 
Automotive events
Auto shows